Chaplin may refer to:

People 
 Charlie Chaplin (1889–1977), English comedy film actor and director
 Chaplin (name), other people named Chaplin

Films 
 Unknown Chaplin (1983)
 Chaplin (film) (1992)
 Chaplin (2011 film), Bengali film starring Rudranil Ghosh

Stage musicals 
 Chaplin (1993 musical) (1993), a stage musical with music by Roger Anderson, lyrics by Lee Goldsmith and book by Ernest Kinoy
 Chaplin (2006 musical) (2006), a musical with music and lyrics by Christopher Curtis and a book by Curtis and Thomas Meehan

Places 
Chaplin, Connecticut
Chaplin, Nelson County, Kentucky
Chaplin, West Virginia
Chaplin, Nova Scotia
Chaplin, Saskatchewan
Chaplin Lake, lake in Saskatchewan
Rural Municipality of Chaplin No. 164, Saskatchewan

Other 
 Chaplin (magazine), Swedish film magazine published by the Swedish Film Institute from 1959 to 1997

See also 
Chaplain, a member of the clergy; often misspelled "chaplin."
Chaplain (surname)